The Red Star Auto Manufacturing Company is an automobile manufacturer located in Shijiazhuang, Hebei, People's Republic of China. The company was founded in 1912 under the name Red Star Automobile Works. In it early time the manufacturer was owned by the state.

In 2002 Red Star was bought from the Shijiazhuang ShuangHuan Automobile Co., Ltd. Since that time ShuangHuan continues the Red Star name. Currently models produced by Red Star are the Red Star Noble and the Shuanghuan SCEO. The Red Star vehicles can be distinguished on the brand logo and/or on the Vehicle Identification Number. Red Star is using the code LHA. The third model, a minivan named Red Star HX5028 was placed in autumn 2015. It was specially created for agricultural use. For city use it is also available as a fully electric panel van.

In addition to automotive production, the company maintains a network of dealers and repair shops under its Red Star brand name, which can be found in many cities of Hebei province.

References

External links
Official Website of the Red Star Auto Manufacturing Company

Car manufacturers of China
Vehicle manufacturing companies established in 1912
Chinese companies established in 1912